Danja is a Local Government Area in Katsina State, Nigeria. Its headquarters are in the town of Danja.

Danja Local government was created  on 27 September 1991 following the creation of additional Local Government Areas throughout the country in 1991, with Danja Town as its headquarters, it was carved out of the former Bakori Local Government Area.

History  

Danja town was founded long time ago by a group of hunters  and they were brave men. The leader of the group was called "JA" and his son was called "DANJA" which  means son of "JA" from which the town derived its name, they  found the land to be rich and fertile, they started farming activities and had a bumper harvest, this attracted more people to the area, they came from far and near to settle down. They later built a wall around their town for protection from enemies, this wall is called Ganuwa and it has four entrance that are named; Kofar Gabas, Kofar Kudu, Kofar Yamma and Kofar Arewa respectively, and up to this time there are still some tresses of the city wall in some parts of the town.

Geography 

Danja is located in the southern part of Katsina State under Funtua Senatorial Zone. Danja is bordered by Funtua Local Government to the north-west, Bakori and Kafur Local Governments to the north and east respectively. While to the South, Danja Local Government shares boundaries with Kudan Local Government and to the West with Giwa Local Government all of Kaduna State. It also share borders  from the south-east with Rogo Local Government Area of Kano State.

It has an area of 501 km2.

Politics 

Danja Local Government has one District Area, Headed by one District Head with the title of Sarkin Kudun Katsina in the person of Alh M. T. Bature, appointed by HRH late Alh (Dr) Muhammadu Kabir Usman Sarkin Katsina (RIP). Alh M.T. Bature is the son of Alh Ibrahim Nadabo Iyan Katsina, District Head of Bakori/Danja (1953–56), and the son of Alh Labaran Nadabo Iyan Katsina, District Head Danja/Bakori (1914–1952) and the son of Iya Abdullahi Nadabo Iyan Katsina (1869–1883).

The District was first created in 1914 by Sarkin Katsina Muhammadu Dikko of blessed memory and appointed Alh Labaran Nadabo as the first District Head of Danja with the title of Makaman Katsina, but after the death of Iya Zakari District Head of Mashi in 1923, the title of Iyan Katsina was returned to Iya Abdullahi Nadobo's Family those Makama Labaran District Head Danja was returbaned as Iyan Katsina DH Danja.

In 1932 for strategic and colonial administrative reason, the District Headquarters of Danja District was moved to Bakori town, those bringing Danja to be a Village Area, with a Village Head, Sarkin Fulanin Danja as the administrative head of Danja Village Area, the Village Head that ruled Danja with the title of Sarkin Fulanin Danja from 1914 are as follows:

 Sarkin Fulanin Danja Idris Nadabo 1915–1939
 Sarkin Fulanin Danja Ibrahim Nadabo 1939–1953
 Sarkin Fulanin Danja Muntari Nadabo 1953–1956
 Sarkin Fulanin Danja Usman Captain Nadabo 1956–1988
 Sarkin Fulanin Danja Abubakar Sadiq Nadabo 1988–1991
 Sarkin Fulanin Danja Alh Yazid Sadiq  Nadabo 1992–

Currently Danja District is composed of twelve (12) Village Areas headed by Village Heads who assist the District Head in running the affairs of the District. The Village Areas include Danja, Dabai, Tsangamawa, Tandama, Kahutu, Yakaji, Jiba, Majedo, Chediya, Bazanga, Dauraku and Danmaigauta.

LOCAL GOVERNMENT ADMINISTRATION 1991-

Politically Danja Local Government consists of ten (10) Political Wards namely; Danja 'A', Danja 'B', Dabai, Tandama, Kahutu 'A', Kahutu 'B', Tsangamawa, Yakaji 'A', Yakaji 'B', Jiba.

Since its creation, Danja LGA has experienced a series of leadership, some were elected chairmen, some served as administrators or appointed caretaker

Demographics 
According to 2006 census, Danja LGA has a population of 125,703 people residing within the area.

The predominant tribes inhabiting of Danja Local Government Area are, Hausas, Fulanis and some small number of yorubas, Kanuris and Igbos, and the likes, vast majority of the population are Muslims and small number of Christians. Hausa language is the major language of communication in the Local Government Area.

Economy 

 Agriculture
The Danja Local Government Area, is blessed with a very rich fertile land with very good atmosphere suitable for agricultural activities, particularly rainy season farming during which they cultivate varieties of crops such as Maize, G/corn, Soya Beans, White Beans, Groundnuts, cotton, millet, Cassava, and Rice.   As a fact, over 95% of the people are predominantly farmers.  In addition to the rainy season farming, the people practice a lot of irrigation farming, large Fadamas found in the area made it possible for the inhabitants to grow Tomatoes, in fact according to GEMS4s' researches and analysis(2018/19) of Tomato production and its potential output in Twelve States in Nigeria. Danja Local Govt is the largest producer of Tomato with the potentiallaity output of 776,025mt of Tomato annually. Other crops are Rice, Sugar Cane and Irish Potatoes, which are also produce in large quantities; other crops are Wheat and Onions. Moreover, many of its people rear Animals such as Cows, Sheep and Goats. In addition there are Poultry Farmers and also Fulani Hardsmen whose occupation is Cattle rearing.

 Commercial Activities
Major Markets of Danja Local Government are Danja Market, Chunko Market Kokami, Dabai Market, Tandama Market, some seasonal Tomato Markets at Danja, Nahuce, and Chunko. Also a Cotton Market at Danja. Being an agricultural area it always attracts Merchants from far and near, and is always full of commercial activity. In addition, there is a Sugar Company, several pure Water Companies, Bakeries, a Micro-finance Bank, Access Bank PLC, and some shopping plazas and several Communication mathias, and many Petrol Stations, and there are Three  Tomato Cottage Industries.
Now the State Govt is construction a very big dam for irrigation and farming.

 Mineral Resources
Danja Local Government is blessed with abundant and different varieties of Mineral resources located in different parts of the Local Government, these include precious stones such as Gold, Nickel, Beirut, and Tantalite, others are Iron Ore,  Kaolin, and Coal. Presently there are some companies with leasing licenses that are working in their sites.

Education 

Danja has Ninety Three (93) number of Primary Schools some of which are: The Pilot Primary School Danja, Government Girls Primary School Danja, Almajad Academy Dabai, about ten (10)  private primary schools, Six (6)  Private Secondary Schools at Danja and Dabai. It has five (5) Government Day Secondary Schools, about Five (5) Community Secondary Schools at Jiba, Unguwar Balarabe and Danja, Including Girls Community Day Secondary School and DEDA (Co-Education) Community Day Secondary School  both in Danja town, a Business Apprentice Training Centre Danja, that serves Danja, Bakori and Kafur LGA (3) Community College Of Arabic and Islamic  Studies at Danja, Dabai and Dan'amarya.  Also a branch of Takai Collage Of Arabic Advance Studies affiliated to ABU Zaria that award Diploma Certificate and Another Diploma awarding Institution is Abdullahi Aminci College Of Advance Studies that is affiliated to ABU Zaria, both in Danja Town, then Several Islamiya schools across the Local Government Area.

Health services

There are 54 health facilities in Danja L.G.A.
One Comprehensive Health Centre in Danja Town, 5 Primary Health Centres at Dabai, Tandama, Kokami, Jiba, and Kahutu. 3 MDGs at Kokami Nahuce and Tsangamawa. 2 Health Clinic at Chediya and Nahuce. 1 Family Support Health Centre at Danja. The remaining 42 are Dispensaries providing health services across the local Government Area.

References

 
Alh Yazid Sadiq Nadabo Sarkin Fulanin Danja.  Edited 2018,2020 and 2021-

Iya Nadabo Ginshikin Maza by Alh Ibrahim  Nadabo Kankara.

Katsina Dankin Kara by Lurwanu Caranci, Published by NNPC Zaria.

The Transformation Of Katsina: (1400-1883) by Dr Yusufu Bala Usman, Published by ABU Press Ltd.

Local Government Areas in Katsina State